Sharon Carson (née O'Kane; born 27 September 1976) is a former Australian rugby union player. She made her test debut for Australia in 1996 against New Zealand in Sydney. She was part of the Wallaroos 1998 and 2002 Rugby World Cup squads.

References 

1976 births
Living people
Australian female rugby union players
Australia women's international rugby union players